The Magus is a fictional character appearing in American comic books published by Marvel Comics. He is a techno-organic patriarch of an alien civilization.

Publication history
The Magus first appeared in the New Mutants #18-19 (August-September 1984). He was created by writer Chris Claremont and artist Bill Sienkiewicz. The character and his son, the New Mutant, Warlock, were intended as an homage to Jim Starlin's characters: the original Magus and Adam Warlock.

The character subsequently appeared in The Uncanny X-Men #192 (April 1985), and The New Mutants #46-47 (December 1986-January 1987), and #50 (April 1987).  The character did not appear again for many years, until Warlock #7-9 (April-June 2000), and X-Force #2 (May 2008).

The Magus received an entry in the Official Handbook of the Marvel Universe Deluxe Edition #8.

Fictional character biography
The Magus is the ruler of the extraterrestrial Technarchy. Due to a bizarre custom wherein Warlock was expected to kill his father, Warlock instead fled to Earth and joined the New Mutants. He did this to escape having to kill or be killed by his father and to escape the potential responsibility of being ruler of a world of depraved robotic fiends. The Magus followed him, arriving on Earth the following winter in the form of a meteorite impacting near the X-Mansion. Only three X-Men (Colossus, Nightcrawler, and Rogue) were then on the mansion grounds to oppose the Magus, yet still inflicted upon him a painful and humiliating setback which prompted Magus to hide himself on Earth in human guise in order to study the mutants of Xavier Mansion incognito.  Magus eventually did battle with Warlock and his New Mutant teammates resulting in Magus being sent back to his point of origin.

Deep in space, Magus met the New Mutants again. Assisted by the Starjammers and Professor X, the Magus was "reprogrammed" into reverting to an infant state. He later returned to normal and sought out his son. He confronted a new version called 'Douglock', which was not exactly the entity he expected. A combined force consisting of several Avengers, Wolfsbane and two newer super-powered people, Hope and Psimon, confronted him during his attack on New York. Magus was defeated when Douglock combined his abilities with Hope's matter-transformation powers and was thought to have returned to his home planet.

It was eventually discovered that before Magus left Earth, he placed an offspring underwater. This offspring was approached by members of the Purifiers, enemies of the X-Men, who "awoke" it when the submarine used by The Purifiers transmitted the word "Warlock."

As it was in a mindless state, Bastion rewrote its programming and infected Donald Pierce and the Leper Queen, as well as reviving the lifeless remains of Bolivar Trask, Cameron Hodge, Stephen Lang, Graydon Creed and Reverend William Stryker with the Technarch transmode virus, declaring them to be the future of humanity and the end of mutantkind.

Techno, Inc
Later the All-New X-Factor, a privately owned and operated super-team handpicked by Serval Industries' CEO Harrison Snow, while investigating a high tech organization rival to Serval Industries, unexpectedly discover that Magus was once again on Earth and heading up the corporation. Not only that, but Magus' previously estranged son, Warlock, was now on his side. With the help of Doug Ramsey, they confronted Magus, who reveals that after the fight with his son where he ends being infected with a virus, he tried to reboot and rid himself from the virus when he reached his planet, however the virus broke free and infected all the technarchy and laid waste over the planet with only a handful of technarchs having survived. On the verge of extinction Magus decided to make amends with his son, setting aside the race's genetic disposition of father killing son so that they could live in harmony. Presented with the fact that Magus only is merely running his own corporation, the All-New X-Factor was forced to leave.

Powers and abilities
The Magus is a techno-organic entity, a creature composed entirely of living circuitry. His body is black and yellow, and tends to be hundreds of meters high. Like all others of his kind, his powers include shapeshifting, super strength, starflight, the ability to mimic and interface with any technological artifact, and the ability to transform any organic life-form into a techno-organic being like himself via the infectious Transmode Virus. Though able to draw energy from a variety of ambient and artificial sources, transforming living beings and draining them of their life energy seems to be his preferred means of sustenance. His size and strength are limited only by the amount of power he can acquire and store. At full power he has been shown as capable of eclipsing a star and tear it apart through strength alone. However, he has proved vulnerable to relatively mundane attacks when close to human size.

The Magus is extraordinarily violent, brutal, and arrogant. His species, (save Warlock, who is a mutant) is incapable of love, compassion, or mercy. Entirely male, they reproduce by mechanical means, after which it is customary for father and son to fight to the death.

The Magus has also demonstrated a high level of intelligence and cunning. As proven by his ability to enter Limbo under his own power, Magus also possesses the ability of interdimensional transportation.

Other versions

Marvel 2099
A version of the Magus has lasted into the alternate future of Marvel 2099. There, he and his race threaten the last outposts of a Phalanx-flooded earth. Magus himself fights that era's Doctor Doom and Spider-Man.

References

External links
 Cerebra's Magus File
 

Characters created by Bill Sienkiewicz
Characters created by Chris Claremont
Comics characters introduced in 1984
Fictional characters with energy-manipulation abilities
Marvel Comics aliens
Marvel Comics characters who are shapeshifters
Marvel Comics characters who can move at superhuman speeds
Marvel Comics characters with superhuman strength
Marvel Comics extraterrestrial supervillains
Marvel Comics male supervillains
Marvel Comics telepaths